Igreja de Santo André  is a gothic church in Mafra, Portugal. It is classified as a National Monument.

Buildings and structures in Mafra, Portugal
Churches in Lisbon District
National monuments in Lisbon District